{{DISPLAYTITLE:C21H22O4}}
The molecular formula C21H22O4 (molar mass : 338.39 g/mol, exact mass : 338.151809 u) may refer to:

 Bergamottin, a natural furanocoumarin
 Licochalcone A, a polyphenol
 Taxamairin A